Juárez is a metro station on the Mexico City Metro. It is located in the Cuauhtémoc borough of Mexico City.

Name and iconography
The station logo depicts the bust of Benito Juárez (1806-1872), a Mexican lawyer and politician of Zapotec origin from Oaxaca who served five terms as the president of Mexico: 1858–1861 as interim, then 1861–1865, 1865–1867, 1867–1871 and 1871–1872 as constitutional president. This station's name, along with Metro Guelatao, refers to the Mexican politician and is located close to Juárez Avenue. The station opened on 20 November 1970, and has facilities for the handicapped.

General information
Juárez serves the Centro neighborhood, near the downtown area of the city. It is located on Balderas Avenue, and the walk from the station to the important Eje Central Lázaro Cárdenas Avenue has many specialty stores.

Ridership

Nearby
Teatro Metropólitan, theatre.
Museo de Arte Popular, popular art museum.
Newspaper Milenio headquarters.

Exits
East: Balderas Street and Art. 123 Street, Centro
West: Balderas Street and Independencia Avenue, Centro

References 

Mexico City Metro Line 3 stations
Railway stations opened in 1970
1970 establishments in Mexico
Mexico City Metro stations in Cuauhtémoc, Mexico City
Accessible Mexico City Metro stations